The 2012 Continental Tire Sports Car Challenge was the twelfth season of the Grand American Road Racing Association's support series. It began on January 26–27 at Daytona International Speedway. The entire season of the CTSCC was tape-delayed on Speed, but shown live in its entirety on speed2.com.

Schedule
The first nine rounds were announced on November 9, 2011. The tenth was announced on November 14, 2011.  All rounds were run to a 2-hour, 30 minute duration.

Team news
On October 15, 2011, team owner C. J. Wilson said that he would miss the season due to its interference with the 2012 Major League Baseball season.
After successfully testing a Roush Performance mustang during the 2011 season, Shelby Blackstock announced on October 20 that he and Jade Buford would be competing in the 2012 season.
It was announced on October 27, 2011, that BGB Motorsports would be fielding two Porsche 997's, having previously fielded Porsche Caymans. The last time BGB ran the 911 chassis was in 2010, having also won 3 races with the car during the 2008 season. This also marks the retirement of the Cayman from the series.
It was announced on November 3, 2011, that driver Mark Hillstead had died on August 29 of a heart attack.
It was announced on November 3, 2011, that driver Aaron Steele would compete in the race at Daytona International Speedway.
It was announced on November 3, 2011, that Al Carter and Hugh Plumb would return to the B+ Foundation and Fall Line Motorsports. They have entered BMW M3s.
It was announced on December 1, 2011 that Ryan Ellis and Tyler McQuarrie would return to the series full-time in 2012 campaigning a BMW 128i in the Street Tuner division.

Event notes
During the round at Indianapolis, a motorhome caught fire. At least half of the vehicle was destroyed. The flames became so intense that the smoke forced a full course caution.

References

2012
Continental Tire Sports Car Challenge